Half Dead and Dynamite is an album by the Minnesota indie rock band Lifter Puller, released in 1997. The album was reissued in 2009.

Critical reception
City Pages wrote that singer Craig Finn "is a wry and bizarre punk poet, relating obscure tales of high-school depravity, boredom, and violence that unravel as teenage escape songs written from a semi-female perspective."

Track listing
"To Live and Die in LBI" – 3:13
"I Like the Lights" – 3:33
"Sherman City" – 3:31
"Naussau Coliseum" – 6:13
"Kool NYC" – 1:42
"Half Dead and Dynamite" – 3:21
"The Bears" – 1:55
"Hardware" – 2:24
"The Gin and the Sour Defeat" – 3:51
"Viceburgh" – 6:04
"Rock for Lite Brite" – 2:23

References

External links
Archive of the official Lifter Puller discography

Lifter Puller albums
1997 albums